Bolesław Andrzej Własnowolski, VM, KW, (29 November 1916 – 1 November 1940) was a Polish fighter ace in the Second World War. He fought in the September Campaign and the Battle of Britain. Własnowolski is credited with four individual and one shared victories. He was killed when a German Messerschmitt Bf 109 aircraft shot down his Hawker Hurricane over southern England.

Life
Własnowolski was born on 29 November 1916 in Kraków, which was then part of the Austro-Hungarian Empire. His father, Władysław Własnowolski, was a railway clerk.

Własnowolski joined the Polish Air Force in October 1936 and started training to be a fighter pilot in October 1937.

In the September Campaign in 1939, 122 Squadron was transferred to an airfield at Balice, west of Kraków. On 2 September, Własnowolski shared the shooting down of a Dornier Do 17 bomber. After the USSR invaded Poland on 17 September, III/1 Division evacuated to Romania.

On 15 October 1939 a large group of Polish airmen including Własnowolski left Romania by ship from the Black Sea port of Balchik. They reached Beirut in French-ruled Lebanon, where they joined a French ship that reached Marseille on 29 October. In France, Własnowolski was initially posted to Salon-de-Provence Air Base.

Late in 1939 Własnowolski left France for England to transfer to the Royal Air Force Volunteer Reserve. He trained at RAF Eastchurch in Kent and RAF Sutton Bridge in Lincolnshire.

On 8 August 1940 Własnowolski joined No. 32 Squadron RAF, which flew Hawker Hurricanes from RAF Biggin Hill in Kent. On 13 September he was transferred to No. 607 Squadron, which flew Hurricanes from RAF Tangmere in West Sussex. In the Battle of Britain he claimed a Messerschmitt Bf 109 on 15 August, and a Do 17 shared (of KG 76) and a Bf 109 (of JG 26) on 18 August. He claimed another Do 17 on 15 September.

On 17 September, Własnowolski was transferred to No. 213 Squadron, which also flew Hurricanes from Tangmere. On 1 November 1940 a Bf 109 of I/JG 2 shot him down over the village of Stoughton, West Sussex. He crashed fatally on a farm near the village.

Grave and monument

Własnowolski is buried in the CWGC Roman Catholic section of the main cemetery in Chichester, England. On 1 February 1941 the Polish government-in-exile posthumously awarded him the Virtuti Militari, 5th Class. On 31 October 1947 he was posthumously awarded the Cross of Valour (Krzyż Walecznych).

There is a monument to Własnowolski beside the path to Kingley Vale from Stoughton, beside the field where his Hurricane crashed.

Footnotes

References

Further reading
 Tadeusz Jerzy Krzystek, Anna Krzystek: Polskie Siły Powietrzne w Wielkiej Brytanii w latach 1940-1947 łącznie z Pomocniczą Lotniczą Służbą Kobiet (PLSK-WAAF). Sandomierz: Stratus, 2012, p. 614. 
 Jerzy Pawlak: Absolwenci Szkoły Orląt: 1925-1939. Warszawa: Retro-Art, 2009, p. 223-224. 
 Piotr Sikora: Asy polskiego lotnictwa. Warszawa: Oficyna Wydawnicza Alma-Press. 2014, p. 345-348. 
 Józef Zieliński: Asy polskiego lotnictwa. Warszawa: Agencja lotnicza ALTAIR, 1994, p. 70. ISBN 83862172. 
 Józef Zieliński: Lotnicy polscy w Bitwie o Wielką Brytanię. Warszawa: Oficyna Wydawnicza MH, 2005, p. 217. 

1916 births
1940 deaths
Military personnel from Kraków
Polish military personnel killed in World War II
Polish World War II flying aces
Polish Royal Air Force pilots of World War II